Işıklar (literally "lights") is a town (belde) and municipality in the Afyonkarahisar District, Afyonkarahisar Province, Turkey. Its population is 7,427 (2021). It is situated on Turkish state highway D.300 close to the Sugar refinery of Afyon.

Before the advance of motor vehicles, Işıklar was a stop in caravan routes and the name of the settlement may refer to its fire lights in that period.

References

Towns in Turkey
Populated places in Afyonkarahisar District